KYMR-FM (88.9 FM) is a radio station licensed to serve the community of Metlakatla, Alaska. The station is owned by the Annette Islands School District.

The station was assigned the KYMR-FM call letters by the Federal Communications Commission on March 17, 2010.

References

External links
 Official Website
 

YMR-FM
Radio stations established in 2010
2010 establishments in Alaska
High school radio stations in the United States
Prince of Wales–Hyder Census Area, Alaska